The Kunhar River or River Kunhar, is a  long river, located primarily in the Khyber Pakhtunkhwa province, northern Pakistan. It is in the Indus River watershed basin.

Its previous name was NainSukh (Ankhon ka Araam). Some people claim after the arrival of Swatis in Hazara, this river was renamed because Swatis were originally from Kunar, Province of Afghanistan.

Origin and route

The river originates from the upper Kaghan Valley's Dharamsar Lake, near Babusar Pass. The waters of Dudipat and Saiful Muluk Lakes feed the river, besides glacial waters from Malka Parbat and other high peaks in the valley. River Kunhar flows through the entire Kaghan valley and enters into Nainsukh Valley from Balakot comprising Garhi Habibullah and Dalola. It joins the Jhelum River at Rarah about 10 km downstream from Muzaffarabad, in the Azad Kashmir, Pakistan.

See also 
List of rivers of Pakistan

References

External links

PTDC Official website

Indus basin
Rivers of Khyber Pakhtunkhwa